Attorney General Ervin may refer to:

Richard Ervin (1905–2004), Attorney General of Florida
William S. Ervin (1886–1951), Attorney General of Minnesota